Edinburgh Wanderers is a former rugby union club, founded in 1868. It was latterly a tenant of the Scottish Rugby Union, playing home fixtures at Murrayfield Stadium for nearly 75 years. In 1997 it merged with Murrayfield RFC to form Murrayfield Wanderers.

Formation

The rugby club was formed in 1868. The club was initially known as St. Andrew's Wanderers, as it was formed by St. Andrew's University graduates based in Edinburgh.

Early history

The club quickly became known as Edinburgh Wanderers - and the side established itself as one of the best in Scotland. In the world's first provincial match - between Glasgow District and Edinburgh District - in 1872, the side was already known as Edinburgh Wanderers and provided 3 players to the first Edinburgh District side:- A. Ross; J. Forsyth and A. R. Stewart 

The club would have been the ninth founding club of the Scottish Rugby Union had the club secretary made it to the inauguration meeting of the union in 1872.

Instead it initially joined the English Rugby Union in that same year. However a year later as the Scottish Rugby Union grew, the Wanderers resigned from the English union to join the SRU.

The Wanderers team of 1876-77 is noted as one of the best in its history.

In 1937 Wanderers provided both captains, Ross Logan and Idwal Rees, in the Scotland v Wales fixture that year. This remains the only time in the history of rugby that opposing international captains were, at the same time, teammates at club level.

Renaming and admission of MRFC members

At a Special General Meeting in 1997 Wanderers changed their name for a second time to become Murrayfield Wanderers FC. This was to facilitate the merger of the Murrayfield RFC. The Club then invited the members of Murrayfield RFC to join the renamed organisation and this proposal was accepted at an SGM of MRFC shortly thereafter.

For the subsequent history of Murrayfield Wanderers see:

Honours

 Scottish Division 2 winners: 1990.
 Scottish Division 3 winners: 1984.
 Hawick Sevens
 Champions (1): 1946 (jointly fielded team with Edinburgh Academicals)
 Melrose Sevens
 Champions (1): 1973
 Peebles Sevens
 Champions (1): 1947 (jointly fielded team with Edinburgh Academicals)
 Edinburgh Charity Sevens
 Champions (5 outright): 1942 & 1945 (both years a jointly fielded team with Edinburgh Academicals), 1953, 1966, 1967, 1973, 1974
 Royal HSFP Sevens
 Champions (2): 1971, 1988
 Portobello Sevens
 Champions (1): 1982
 Moray Sevens
 Champions (1): 1968
 Kirkcaldy Sevens
 Champions (1): 1970
 Howe of Fife Sevens
 Champions (4): 1970, 1973, 1988, 1989
 Stirling Sevens
 Champions (1): 1984
 Greenock Sevens
 Champions (6): 1960, 1961, 1962, 1973, 1978, 1986
 Ardrossan Sevens
 Champions (1): 1965
 Edinburgh Northern Sevens
 Champions (1): 1990, 1992, 1997

Notable former players

British and Irish Lions

The following former Edinburgh Wanderers players have represented the British and Irish Lions.

Scotland internationalists

The following former Edinburgh Wanderers players have represented Scotland at full international level.

Notable non-Scottish players

The following is a list of notable non-Scottish international representative former Edinburgh Wanderers players:

Edinburgh District players

The following former Edinburgh Wanderers players have represented Edinburgh District at provincial level.

Professional players

Professionalism began in rugby union in 1995 - and in Scotland it came a year later in 1996. These players went on from the Wanderers to professional teams:

  Murray Craig

Notable also outside of rugby

The following is a list of notable former Edinburgh Wanderers players who have achieved notability in fields outwith rugby:

  Roy Williamson - Songwriter and folk musician of The Corries

References

Rugby union in Edinburgh
1868 establishments in Scotland
Rugby clubs established in 1868
Scottish rugby union teams
Defunct Scottish rugby union clubs